The 1798 Karlsruhe Synagogue was an early building by the influential architect Friedrich Weinbrenner in the city of Karlsruhe.   According to David Brownlee, this "synagogue was the first large Egyptian building to be erected since antiquity."  According to Diana Muir Appelbaum, it was "the first public building (that is, not a folly, stage set, or funeral monument) in the Egyptian revival style."  Appelbaum writes that the pair of tall pylons are copied from the temple at Karnak.

The structure stood until 1871.

References

External links 
 Further sketches of the synagogue available at: http://weinbrenner-gesellschaft.de/wp-content/uploads/synagoge-karlsruhe.jpg   
 And a model at: http://www.museum-digital.de/bawue/index.php?t=objekt&oges=995

Buildings and structures in Karlsruhe
Egyptian Revival synagogues
Former synagogues in Germany
Religious buildings and structures in Baden-Württemberg